Chaetocladium is a genus of fungi in the family Mucoraceae.

References

External links 
 

  
 Chaetocladium at Mycobank

Zygomycota genera
Mucoraceae